Full Circle is a studio album by American country music singer Dottie West, released in 1982.

Full Circle was one of Dottie West's most unsuccessful albums in her career. Her solo career in country music had been revitalized in 1978 with the help of a string of hit duets with Kenny Rogers. By 1979, hits of her own were making the Country Top 10 again. However, by late 1982, after the release of this album, her country success was beginning to fade. Many fans felt it was a mistake for West to record some of the very sexual songs (at least by her standards) on the album and the two single releases were her lowest charting records in several years. This album did not chart on the "Top Country Albums" chart at all, but it did produce two country singles which charted on Billboard's Country chart, "She Can't Get My Love Off the Bed" (which was quite successful, in the Top 30) and "If It Takes All Night" (didn’t hit the Top 40).

Track listing

Charts
Singles – Billboard (North America)

Dottie West albums
1982 albums
Liberty Records albums